The Estadio Fernando Torres is a multi-use stadium located in Fuenlabrada, Community of Madrid, Spain. It is currently used for football matches and is the home stadium of CF Fuenlabrada.

History
Built in 2011 as an honour to Fernando Torres (who was born in the city of Fuenlabrada), the stadium was inaugurated on 1 September of that year in a friendly against Atlético Madrid, Torres' first club, with his parents as honorary guests. In 2017, the stadium hosted Real Madrid in a Copa del Rey match which ended in a 2–0 victory for Los Blancos.

In June 2019, after CF Fuenlabrada's promotion to Segunda División, the stadium went through some constructions which included an adaptation to meet the LFP criteria.

References

External links
CF Fuenlabrada profile  
Estadios de España
Soccerway profile

Football venues in the Community of Madrid
CF Fuenlabrada
Sports venues completed in 2011